The national symbols of Vietnam are official and unofficial flags, icons or cultural expressions that are emblematic, representative or otherwise characteristic of Vietnam and of its culture.

Symbol

References 

National symbols of Vietnam